A demand draft (DD) is a negotiable instrument similar to a bill of exchange. A bank issues a demand draft to a client (drawer), directing another bank (drawee) or one of its own branches to pay a certain sum to the specified party (payee).

A demand draft can also be compared to a cheque. However, demand drafts are difficult to countermand. Demand drafts can only be made payable to a specified party, also known as pay-to-order. But, cheques can also be made payable to the bearer. Demand drafts are orders of payment by a bank to another bank, whereas cheques are orders of payment from an account holder to the bank. A Drawer has to visit the branch of the Bank and fill the DD form and pay the amount either by cash or any other mode, and Bank will issue DD[demand draft]. A Demand Draft has a validity of three months from the date of issuance of DD. 
For Example, Joining in College needs an admission fee and the college can collect the amount either by cash or DD. Most Colleges won't accept Cheques, here is the reason why. DD is safer than Cheque because the Drawee has to pay the amount before receiving DD from the hand of Bank while a cheque can be spurious as the drawee doesn't know whether the drawer's bank account is sufficient to pay that amount. The drawer need not be the Customer of the bank. DD bears stamp.

Definitions and regulations by region

Demand drafts are also known as sight drafts, as they are payable when presented by sight to the bank. Under UCC 3-104, a draft has been defined as a negotiable instrument in the form of an order. The person making the order is known as the drawer and the person specified in the order is called the drawee, as defined in the UCC 3–103. The party who creates the draft is called the maker, and the party who is ordered to pay is called the drawee.

In the United States, remotely created cheques are also called demand drafts. Remotely created cheques are orders of payment created by the payee and authorized by the customer remotely, using a telephone or the internet by providing the required information including the MICR code from a valid cheque. They do not bear the signatures of the customers like ordinary cheques. Instead, they bear a legend statement "Authorized by Drawer". This type of instrument is usually used by credit card companies, utility companies, or telemarketers. Remotely created cheques are susceptible to fraud.

See also

 Cashier's check
 Money order
 Traveler's cheque

References

Payment systems